Amity University, Gwalior, also known as Amity University, Madhya Pradesh has been established by Madhya Pradesh Act No. 27 of 2010 of Government of Madhya Pradesh and is recognized as per Section 2(f) of the University Grants Commission Act.

Recognition and accreditation
Amity University Madhya Pradesh is a private university established by the Ritnand Balved Education Foundation, a society registered under the Societies Registration Act, 1860 and  has been established by Madhya Pradesh Act No. 27 of 2010 of Government of Madhya Pradesh. The university campus is located on 100 acres of land opposite Gwalior Airport with modern amenities like spacious lecture theaters, classrooms, seminar halls, and an auditorium.

Academics
The university offers programs in the fields of architecture, biotechnology, commerce, communication, computer Science and information technology, economics, engineering, English literature, fashion, finance, language, law, liberal arts, management, and psychology and behavioral science, both at undergraduate and post-graduate levels, besides offering doctoral degree in several of those disciplines.

Rankings

The National Institutional Ranking Framework (NIRF) ranked it 162 among engineering colleges in 2020.

References

External links
 

Private universities in India
Universities in Madhya Pradesh
Universities and colleges in Gwalior
Educational institutions established in 2010
2010 establishments in Madhya Pradesh